Tinbergen is a Dutch surname, and may refer to:

Jan Tinbergen (1903–1994), Dutch economist
 (1934–2010), Dutch astronomer, after whom minor planet 10434 Tinbergen was named.
Joost Tinbergen (born 1950), Dutch ecologist
Luuk Tinbergen (1915–1955), Dutch ornithologist 
Nikolaas Tinbergen (1907–1988), Dutch biologist
Tijs Tinbergen (born 1947), Dutch filmmaker

Other uses
Tinbergen's four questions
Tinbergen Institute
10434 Tinbergen

See also
Sabriye Tenberken

Dutch-language surnames